Sturgeon Lake 154B is an Indian reserve of the Sturgeon Lake Cree Nation in Alberta, located within the Municipal District of Greenview No. 16. It is 4 kilometres south of Sturgeon Lake.

References

Indian reserves in Alberta